Novaya is a rural locality (a village) in Staroselskoye Rural Settlement, Mezhdurechensky District, Vologda Oblast, Russia. The population was 23 as of 2002.

Geography 
Novaya is located 21 km southwest of Shuyskoye (the district's administrative centre) by road. Frolovo is the nearest rural locality.

References 

Rural localities in Mezhdurechensky District, Vologda Oblast